Mati Kepp (born 11 September 1947) is an Estonian politician. He was a member of X Riigikogu, representing the People's Union of Estonia.

Early life and education
Kepp was born in Äksi Parish (now, part of Tartu Parish). In 1971, he graduated from Estonian University of Life Sciences with a degree in agronomy.

Acknowldegements
Order of the White Star, IV Class (2006)

References

Living people
1947 births
Social Democratic Party (Estonia) politicians
People's Union of Estonia politicians
Members of the Riigikogu, 2003–2007
Estonian University of Life Sciences alumni
Recipients of the Order of the White Star, 4th Class
People from Tartu Parish